Gregorio was an Italian cardinal created by Pope Innocent II ca. 1138. He subscribed the papal bulls between 18 June 1135 and 30 June 1137. and died probably in 1141.

References

Sources

J. M. Brixius, Die Mitglieder des Kardinalkollegiums von 1130-1181 Berlin 1912, p. 42 no. 16

12th-century Italian cardinals
1141 deaths
Year of birth unknown